Hypalastoroides is a neotropical genus of potter wasps with a few nearctic and andean species. It differs from other New World genera by having a petiolate second submarginal cell. The genus contains the following subgenera and species:

Subgenus Hypalastoroides
Hypalastoroides angulicollis
Hypalastoroides anomalus
Hypalastoroides argentinus
Hypalastoroides aztecus
Hypalastoroides bicinctus
Hypalastoroides bicingulatus
Hypalastoroides brasiliensis
Hypalastoroides elongatus
Hypalastoroides impunctatus
Hypalastoroides melanosoma
Hypalastoroides mexicanus
Hypalastoroides nitidus
Hypalastoroides oliveri
Hypalastoroides paraguayensis
Hypalastoroides persimilis
Hypalastoroides pulchricolor
Hypalastoroides rotundiceps
Hypalastoroides ruficeps
Hypalastoroides venezuelanus
Subgenus Larastoroides
Hypalastoroides costaricensis
Hypalastoroides ecuadoriensis
Subgenus Ortalastoroides
Hypalastoroides arcuatus
Hypalastoroides clypeatus
Hypalastoroides columbianus
Hypalastoroides funereus
Hypalastoroides macrocephalus
Hypalastoroides singularis
Hypalastoroides slevini

References

 Giordani Soika, A. 1982 (1981). Contributo all conoscenza del genere neotropicale Hypalastoroides Sauss. (Hym. Vesp.). Boll. Mus. Civ. Stor. Nat. Venezia 32: 33–59.

Potter wasps